Aclerdidae are a family of Coccoidea, the scale insects. They are usually found on grasses, sucking sap from the stem, inside the leaf sheaths.

References

External links
Aclerdidae, USDA

 
Scale insects
Hemiptera families
Neococcoids